The Aleksander Zelwerowicz National Academy of Dramatic Art in Warsaw is a public higher education institution in Warsaw, Poland. Its focus is on the theatre arts. It is headquartered in the Collegium Nobilium, an eighteenth-century building which formerly housed an elite boarding secondary school run by Piarist monks.

History
It was founded in Łódź in 1946 and moved to Warsaw in 1949. It continues the tradition of the National Institute of Theatre Arts (Państwowy Instytut Sztuki Teatralnej) established in Łódź in 1932. It was founded as the National Higher School of Theatre (Państwowa Wyższa Szkoła Teatralna) and received a patron (Aleksander Zelwerowicz) in 1955. In 1962 it received certification as a higher education institution. It received its current name in 1996. Faculty members at the National Academy of Dramatic Art in Warsaw were or are predominantly working professionals in their fields, the most notable of these including: Leon Shiller, Erwin Axer, Aleksander Bardini, Stanisława Wysocka, Henryk Elzenberg, Stanisław Ossowski, Zofia Lissa, Edmund Wierciński, Jan Kreczmar, Stefan Jaracz, Maja Komorowska, Bohdan Korzeniewski, Andrzej Łapicki, Zofia Mrozowska, Janina Mieczyńska, Marian Wyrzykowski, Ludwik Sempoliński, Kazimierz Rudzki, Hanka Bielicka, Ignacy Gogolewski, Zbigniew Zapasiewicz, Jan Englert,  Wiesław Komasa, Tadeusz Łomnicki, Gustaw Holoubek, Zygmunt Hűbner, Anna Seniuk.

Rectors

 1946–1949: Leon Schiller
 1949–1967: Jan Kreczmar
 1967–1970: Władysław Krasnowiecki
 1970–1981: Tadeusz Łomnicki
 1981–1987 and 1993–1996: Andrzej Łapicki
 1987–1993 and 1996–2002: Jan Englert
 2002–2008: Lech Śliwonik
 2008–2016: Andrzej Strzelecki
 2016–: Wojciech Malajkat

Notable alumni

Piotr Adamczyk
Michał Bajor
Joanna Brodzik
Agata Buzek
Stanisława Celińska
Andrzej Chyra
Mateusz Damięcki
Paweł Domagała
Bożena Dykiel
Jan Englert
Adam Ferency
Katarzyna Figura
Piotr Fronczewski
Krystyna Janda
Janusz Józefowicz
Krzysztof Kolberger
Marek Kondrat
Małgorzata Kożuchowska
Emilia Krakowska
Piotr Kraśko
Agata Kulesza
Olga Lipińska
Tadeusz Łomnicki
Daniel Olbrychski
Bartosz Opania
Dominika Ostałowska
Jan Machulski
Joanna Pacuła
Franciszek Pieczka
Andrzej Seweryn
Małgorzata Socha
Joanna Szczepkowska
Borys Szyc
Hubert Urbański
Roman Wilhelmi
Rafał Zawierucha
Michał Żebrowski
Artur Żmijewski
Marta Żmuda Trzebiatowska
Zbigniew Zapasiewicz

See also
Theatre of Poland

References

External links
 

1946 establishments in Poland
Universities and colleges in Warsaw
Theatre in Poland
Drama schools in Poland